Timothy Lawrence Davis (November 29, 1943 – September 20, 1988) was a drummer, singer and songwriter, who co-founded the Steve Miller Band.

History 

Davis was born in Milwaukee and raised in Janesville, Wisconsin. He played on the first five albums released by the Steve Miller Band and contributed lead and background vocals and songwriting.  Davis left the band to work with others, such as Ben Sidran, and to commence a solo career.  Shortly after his departure from Miller, Davis joined David Lindley in a band supporting Terry Reid, appearing at the Isle of Wight Festival in 1970.

Davis had a modest hit in 1972, "Buzzy Brown", written by fellow Wisconsin musician and Steve Miller Band co-founder James "Curley" Cooke.  Davis continued an association with Steve Miller, contributing two songs, co-written with Miller, to the 1984 Steve Miller Band album, Italian X Rays.

Davis died in 1988 from complications from diabetes at the age of 44.

Discography

Steve Miller Band

1968 Children of the Future
1968 Sailor
1969 Brave New World
1969 Your Saving Grace
1970 Number 5
1972 Anthology
1990 The Best of 1968-1973
1994 Box Set (3 CD compilation)
2003 Young Hearts

Solo

1972 Pipe Dream
1974 Take Me As I Am

Contributions to Others

1967 Chuck Berry, Live at the Fillmore Auditorium
1968 Jefferson Airplane, Crown of Creation 
1971 Ben Sidran, I Lead A Life
1973 Ben Sidran, Puttin' In Time On Planet Earth

General Compilations

1994 Texas Music, Vol. 3: Garage Bands & Psychedelia (Rhino)
1997 The Monterey International Pop Festival, June 16-17-18, 1967 (Rhino); 4-CD set.

References 

1943 births
1988 deaths
American rock musicians
American rock drummers
People from Janesville, Wisconsin
Musicians from Wisconsin
20th-century American drummers
American male drummers
Steve Miller Band members
20th-century American male musicians